Dunlop Castle was a 14th-century castle, about  north of Stewarton, East Ayrshire, Scotland.  A large Jacobean-style house, Dunlop House, was built on the site in 1833.

The castle may be known alternatively as Hunthall.

History
The property belonged to the Dunlops from the 13th century.

Structure
There is no record of the structure of the castle.  It was described as “"an ancient strong house fortified with a deep foussie [ditch] of water".  There was a stone dated 1599 over the doorway (and it was transferred to the present house; it is inscribed, “"O Lord let ever thy blessings remain within this house".

Tradition
Dunlop cheese is said to have originated here,

See also
Castles in Great Britain and Ireland
List of castles in Scotland

References

Castles in East Ayrshire
History of East Ayrshire